Merelinense Futebol Clube also known as Merelinense FC is a Portuguese football club from São Pedro de Merelim in Braga and founded in 1938. Merelinense FC currently plays in the Campeonato de Portugal. They currently play their home games at Estádio João Soares Vieira in Braga with a capacity of 5000.

Achievements
Braga FA Cup – 3: 1977–78, 2013–14, 2015–16
Braga FA Championship – 6: 1977–78, 1981–82, 1990–91, 1997–98, 2003–04, 2015–16
Braga Supercup – 1: 2015–16
Minho Champions Cup – 1: 2015–16

Advancements
Portuguese Cup: 1/4 final (2010–11 season), defeated Varzim 1–2, lost to Vitória de Guimarães 0–2 the following match.

League and cup history

Current squad

Presidents

 Ántónio Ferreira da Sila (late-2000s)
 Paulo Rafael (late-2000s)

References

External links
 Merelinense FC official site (Portuguese)

Football clubs in Portugal
Sport in Braga
Association football clubs established in 1938
1938 establishments in Portugal